Tatsuya Suzuki may refer to:

, Japanese forward
, Japanese midfielder
, Japanese defender